Mr. Domino may refer to:
No One Can Stop Mr. Domino!, a video game
Robin Paul Weijers or Mr. Domino, Dutch founder of Weijers Domino Productions